Bhishma Raj Angdembe (Nepali: भीष्म राज आङदेम्बे) is a Nepali politician. He was a member of the Legislature Parliament. 

He was elected a member of the Executive Committee of Nepali Congress in the 12th General Convention of the Nepali Congress and the 13th General Convention.

References

Living people
Nepali Congress politicians from Koshi Province
People from Panchthar District
Year of birth missing (living people)
Members of the 2nd Nepalese Constituent Assembly